The 2011–12 Pittsburgh Panthers women's basketball team represented the University of Pittsburgh in the 2011–12 NCAA Division I women's basketball season. The Panthers, coached by Agnus Berenato, were a member of the Big East Conference and played their home games at the Petersen Events Center in Pittsburgh, Pennsylvania.

Previous season
An unusual distribution of players by academic class, with five seniors and six freshman, but with no juniors or sophomores, and three new assistant coaches resulted in some growing pains for the 2010-11 Pitt women's basketball team which went 14–17, suffering their first losing season since 2004-05. In the Big East, the team finished with a 5–11 record finishing with the 12th seed in the Big East tournament, the Panthers won their first round of the tournament to South Florida, but exited the tournament with a 61–65 loss to Marquette leaving the Panthers without a post-season tournament invitation for the first time since 2005.

Offseason
The Panthers lost their top four scorers, seniors Taneisha Harrison, Jania Sims, Chelsea Cole, and Shayla Scott, and return only one starters, Ashlee Anderson, along with five letter winners while welcoming seven newcomers. Composed of six sophomores and six freshman, with no seniors or juniors, Pitt is the youngest team in NCAA Division 1 for the 2010-11 season. Pitt looks to help replace 74.6% of its scoring, 64.1% of its rebounds, and 75.8% of its assists with its best ever recruiting class, ranked 18th by ESPN's Hoopgurlz, along with redshirt sophomore Abby Dowd, who begins play with the team after transferring from Buffalo during last season.

Staff moves included moving Meghan Bielich to Director of Basketball Operations and adding David Scarborough as the team's Video Coordinator. Assistant coach Patty Coyle was promoted to associate head coach.

The women's basketball team enters the season with modest expectations due to their inexperience and was picked to finish 12th in the Big East Conference in a preseason poll of conference coaches.

Recruiting 
Pitt's 2011 Women's Recruiting Class was ranked 18th by ESPN's Hoopgurlz and 23rd by All-Star Girls Report.

Roster

Schedule
Pitt's 2011-12 women's basketball schedule.

|-
!colspan=9| Exhibition

|-
!colspan=9| Regular Season

|-
!colspan=9| PostseasonBig East Women's Basketball Championship

|-
|-

Rankings

Awards and honors
 The team won the Caribbean Classic at the Moon Palace Golf & Spa Resort in Cancún, Mexico with victories over Indiana and Michigan State.

See also

Pittsburgh Panthers women's basketball
Pittsburgh Panthers men's basketball
2011–12 Pittsburgh Panthers men's basketball team
Pittsburgh Panthers
University of Pittsburgh
Big East Conference

References

External links
 Official Site

Pittsburgh Panthers women's basketball seasons
Pittsburgh